Daustinia is a monotypic genus of flowering plants belonging to the family Convolvulaceae. It only contains one known species, Daustinia montana.

Its native range is eastern Brazil.

The genus name of Daustinia is in honour of Daniel Frank Austin (1943–2015), an American botanist from the University of Arizona. The Latin specific epithet of montana means "of the mountains" referring to the habitat of the plant.
Both the genus and the species were first described and published in Phytotaxa Vol.197 on page 60 in 2015.

References

Convolvulaceae
Monotypic Convolvulaceae genera
Plants described in 2015
Flora of Northeast Brazil
Flora of Southeast Brazil